Atolmis unifascia is a moth of the family Erebidae first described by George Hampson in 1901. It is found on Sumbawa in Indonesia.

References

Lithosiina
Moths described in 1901
Moths of Indonesia